Popati Hiranandani (17 September 1924 - 16 December 2005) was an Indian writer who authored more than sixty books in Sindhi language during her life. She was an essayist, fiction writer, poetess, educationist, feminist and social activist. She made significant contributions to Sindhi literature before and after the partition of India. She won several awards including the Sahitya Akademi Award (1982), Woman of the Year Award (1988), and the Gaurav Puraskar (1990) among others.

Biography 
She was born on 17th September 1924 in a Hindu Amil family of Hyderabad, Sindh.  Her father Ramchand Hiranandani was a forest officer. She was the second eldest of seven children, and lost her father at the age of ten.  She studied at Kundan Mal High School and Miran College Hyderabad. In order to support her family, she joined as  a music teacher at Kundan Mal High School and Pigit Girls School Hyderabad, while continuing her studies simultaneously. After graduating from Banaras Hindu University in 1943 with a distinction in Sanskrit, she began teaching languages and literature. She retired as chairperson of Sindhi Department of Kishinchand Chellaram College, Bombay (now Mumbai). During the last years of her service at this college, she also taught and supervised postgraduate students of the Bombay University.

In 1970, she was nominated as a member of a panel of advisors of the Audition Committee of All India Radio, Bombay. In the same year, she was nominated as a member of the Advisory Board for Sindhi, Ministry of Education, Government of India. In 1972, she was selected as a member of Sahitya Akademi's Advisory Board for Sindhi. In 1974, she served as Secretary of All India Sindhi Language and Literary Association. In 1977, she was a member of the selection committee for Dictionary of Scientific and Technical Terminology and in 1979 as a member of the selection committee of the Union Public Service Commission. In 1988, she was the convener of the Sahitya Akademi's Advisory Board.

Books 
She authored more than 60 books which include short stories, novels, poems, criticism, essays, autobiography and translations. They include:

 Aziz Shaksu Ain Alim, 1980, Criticism 
 Belong to a Land, 1991, Poems
 Bhasha Shastra, 1962, Philology
 Bharat Ji Istri, 1963
 Boli Muhinji Mau, 1977, Essays
 Churan Chimkan Chit Men, 1971, Essays
 Hasratun Ji Turbat, 1961, Novel
 Hiku Pushup Pundhram Pankhriyun, 1962, Essays
 History of Post Independence Sindhi literature, 1984
 Hut Tawheen Hit Aseen, 1988, Short Stories
 Jia Men Jhori, Tan Men Taat, 1968, Short Stories
 Kabir, 1989, Translation
 Kali Gulab Ji Sagar Sharab Jo, 1967, Short Stories
 Khizan jo Daur Pooro Thiyo, 1976, Short Stories
 Learn Sindhi Within 10 Days, 1984
 Maan Chha Ahiyan, 1965
 Man Sindhin, 1988, Poems
 Manik Moti Lal, 1993, Biography
 Manju, 1950, Novel
 Muhinjay Hayatia Ja Sona Rupa Warq, 1980, Autobiography
 Padmini, 1984
 Pukar, 1953, Short Stories
 Rageen Zamanay Joon Ghamgheen Kahaniyoon, 1953, Short Stories
 Ruha Sandhi Ranjh, 1975, Poems
 Shahnaz, 1983, Short Stories
 Sailab Zingia Jo, 1980, Novel
 Shah Sindhi Tahzeeb Jo Rooh, 1983, Latifyat
 Shrimad Bhagvad, 1980, Translation
 Sindhi Boli, 1981, Philology
 Sindhi Muslman Kaviyun Ji Hindi Kavita, 1982
 Sindhi Sahitya Ji Jhalak, 1967
 Sindhi Shadi, 1988
 Sindhis the Scattered Treasurer, 1980
 Tanqeedi Mazmoon, 1985, Criticism
 Vivekanand Jeevani, 1963, Translation
 Zindah Sa Qaum Rahandi, Essays, 1976
 Zindagia Ji Photri (1933)
 Zindagi Na Kavita Na Kahani, 1984, Short Stories

Books on Popati Hiranandani 
Following two books have been written on life and literary contributions of Popti Hiranandani:
 Popati Hiranandani Shakhsiyat ain Sanman Parcho, Koonj Publications, Bombay, 1975
 Paun Phutti Popati, Veena Publications, Ulhasnagar, 1988

Awards and honours
Sahitya Academy Award (1982) on her autobiography Muhinji Hayati-a-Ja Sona-Ropa Warq
 Woman of the Year Award (1988)
 Gaurav Purasker Award (1990) by Maharashtra Government
 Aseen Sindhi Award (1990), Dubai
 Sindhi Academy Award (1993)
 International Latif award (1990), Dubai
 Sindhi Navratan title  (1993) by Sindhi Cultural Association, Mumbai
 Akhil Bharat Sindhi Boli Ain Sahit Sabha Award (1998)
Sources:

Death 
Popati Hiranandai died on 16 December 2005 in Mumbai.

References 

1924 births
2005 deaths
20th-century Indian women writers
20th-century Indian writers
21st-century Indian women writers
21st-century Indian writers
Sindhi female writers
Sindhi-language writers
Sindhi people
People from Hyderabad, Sindh
People from Mumbai
Writers from Mumbai
Writers from Sindh